Cvetak zanovetak (English: Nagging Flower) is the first studio album by Serbian singer Ceca. It was released in 1988 on LP and MC. It has never been released on CD.

Track listing
 Cvetak zanovetak (Nagging flower)
 Želim te u mladosti (I want you while I'm young)
 Đački spomenari (Yearbooks)
 Veliko srce (Big heart)
 Kuda žuriš (What is the hurry?)
 Očima te pijem (I am drinking you with my eyes)
 Detelina sa četiri lista (Four leaf clover)
 Eto, eto, prođe leto (There, There, Summer's over)
 Ja tebe hoću (I want you)

References

1988 albums
Ceca (singer) albums